Jeroen Vanthournout (born 29 June 1989) is a Belgian professional footballer who currently plays for SK Oostnieuwkerke in the Belgian First Amateur Division.

References

External links
Guardian Football

Belgian footballers
1989 births
K.S.V. Roeselare players
K.V.C. Westerlo players
F.C.V. Dender E.H. players
Challenger Pro League players
Belgian Pro League players
Living people
Association football defenders
Sint-Eloois-Winkel Sport players